Soundtrack is a live album by jazz saxophonist Charles Lloyd recorded at The Town Hall, New York City in 1968 by the Charles Lloyd Quartet featuring Keith Jarrett, Ron McClure and Jack DeJohnette.

Reception
The Allmusic review by Thom Jurek awarded the album 4 stars and states "Soundtrack, stomps with all the fury of a live gospel choir trying to claim Saturday night for God instead of the other guy... The band is in a heavy Latin mood, where the blues, samba, bossa, hard bop, modal, and even soul are drenched in the blues. With only four tunes presented, the Charles Lloyd Quartet, while a tad more dissonant than it had been in 1966 and 1967, swings much harder, rougher, and get-to-the-groove quicker than any band Lloyd had previously led... This band would split soon after, when Jarrett left to play with Miles Davis, but if this was a live swansong, they couldn't have picked a better gig to issue".

Track listing
All compositions by Charles Lloyd
 "Sombrero Sam"  - 10:26    
 "Voice in the Night - 9:06
 "Pre-Dawn" - 2:34     
 "Forest Flower '69" - 16:51  
Recorded on November 15, 1968, at the Town Hall, New York City

Personnel
Charles Lloyd - tenor saxophone, flute
Keith Jarrett - piano
Ron McClure - bass
Jack DeJohnette - drums

Production
Eric Sherman - cover concept, photography
Haig Adishian - design
George Avakian - producer

References

Charles Lloyd (jazz musician) live albums
1969 live albums
albums produced by George Avakian
Atlantic Records live albums
Albums recorded at the Town Hall